Henry Boyes Mugliston (1848/1849 – 24 June 1914) was an Australian politician.

Mugliston was elected in 1886 to the Tasmanian House of Assembly, representing the seat of Brighton. He served until his defeat in 1891. He died in 1914 in London.

References

1840s births
1914 deaths
Members of the Tasmanian House of Assembly